Cryptophaginae is a subfamily of silken fungus beetles in the family Cryptophagidae. There are about 11 genera and more than 180 described species in Cryptophaginae.

Genera
These 11 genera belong to the subfamily Cryptophaginae:
 Antherophagus Dejean, 1821
 Caenoscelis Thomson, 1863
 Cryptophagus Herbst, 1792
 Henoticus Thomson, 1868
 Henotiderus Reitter, 1877
 Myrmedophila Bousquet, 1989
 Pteryngium Reitter, 1887
 Renodesta Caterino, Leschen & Johnson, 2008
 Salebius Casey, 1900
 Sternodea Reitter, 1875
 Telmatophilus Heer, 1841

References

Further reading

External links

 

Cucujoidea